ASN-205 UAV and its follow-ons are Chinese UAVs developed by Xi'an Aisheng Technology Group Co., Ltd (西安爱生技术集团公司) ASN Technology Group Co., Ltd (西安爱生技术集团公司), also known as Northwestern Polytechnical University UAV Research Institute or 365th Institute , established in 1984.

ASN-205
ASN-205 is a fixed wing UAV that first appeared on September 6, 2009, during the practice parade of the 60th anniversary of parade on October 1, 2009. ASN-205 is intended as the successor of earlier ASN-104/105 series, and is intended mainly to perform missions of drones, while the other UAV, ASN-206, is intended for reconnaissance missions.

ASN-206
ASN-206 is a fixed wing UAV in twin boom layout with high wing configuration with twin-tail. Propulsion is provided by a two-blade propeller driven engine mounted at the rear end of the fuselage. ASN-206 was reportedly developed under the assistance of Tadiran Spectralink Ltd, an Israeli company specialising in the airborne communications and electronic countermeasures (ECM) systems, but this cannot be confirmed. Though classified by Chinese as a light weight UAV, ASN-206 actually weighs more than 200 kg, and this was mainly caused by the technological bottleneck and limitation of industrial capability China faced back in the early 1990s. In 1996, ASN-206 won State Science and Technology Prizes. Specification:
Wingspan (m): 6
Length (m): 3.8
Height (m): 1.4
Weight (kg): 222
Payload (kg): 50 max
Endurance (hr): 4 – 8
Max speed (km/hr): 210
Ceiling (km): 6
Range (km): 150

JWP01
JWP01 is a fixed wing UAV in twin boom layout with high wing configuration. JWP01 is no longer in production and is in the process of being replaced by its successor JWP02, but some still remain in service. JWP01 is an ASN-206 specially adopted for artillery observation, with an electro-optical sensor payload mounted under the nose.

ASN-207
ASN-207 is a development of ASN-206 and share the identical design layout. ASN-207 adopts new engine and material during its design and construction, enables it to increase its endurance and payload by doubling that of original, thanks to the rapid advancement China made in the technological and industrial capability. Range is also significantly increased. 
Payload (kg): 100 max
Endurance (hr): 8 – 16
Range (km): 600

WZ-6
WZ-6 is the development of ASN-207 adopted by Chinese military. WZ = Wu Zhen, 无侦 in Chinese, short for Wu-Ren Zhen-Zha-Ji  无人侦察机 in Chinese, meaning pilotless reconnaissance aircraft. As its designation implies, this UAV is for reconnaissance missions. The most obvious distinction between WZ-6 and the original ASN-207 is the addition of a mushroom shaped radome installed atop of the fuselage, housing the communication antenna. In addition to electro-optical payload, WZ-6 is also capable of carrying miniature radar to carry out reconnaissance missions.

JWP02
JWP02 UAV is a derivative of WZ-6 and has already entered service with Chinese military. The most obvious external visual difference between WZ-6 and JWP02 is that the electro-optical turret mounted below the fuselage of WZ-6 is absent on JWP02. The exact function of JWP02 remain unclear because Chinese governmental establishments have not released any detailed information on this UAV other than photos of its deployment by Chinese military. Presumably, it is used in reconnaissance missions.

BZK-006
BZK-006 is a further development of WZ-6 adopted by Chinese military, and it is an enlarged WZ-6 with four underwing hardpoints added, two for with wing. BZK-006 is capable of carrying a total of four Chinese UAV employed missiles, and a photo of air-to-surface missile targeting screen has been publicized by Chinese governmental sources when depicting BZK-006 deployed by Chinese military. However, as of 2014, it is not known if BZK-006 carries any air-to-air missiles, so it is purely adopted for ground attack missions. Specification:
Length (m): 4.3
Height (m): 1.5
Endurance (hr): 12

DCK-006
DCK-006 is the unarmed reconnaissance version of BZK-006, and it shares the same dimension with BZK-006, and the endurance of DCK-006 is also 12 hours. Due to the addition of mushroom shaped communication antenna radome, the endurance of WZ-6 is significantly reduced due to additional weight. BZK-006 solves this problem by enlarge the airframe of WZ-6, which share the same smaller airframe with ASN-207, and the enlarged airframe enables more fuel to be stored to extend the range and endurance. DCK-006 share the identical enlarged airframe of BZK-006 and thus having similar performance, which is needed for long endurance reconnaissance missions. DCK-006 made its public debut in the parade in Beijing for the 60th anniversary of the People's Republic of China.

See also
List of unmanned aerial vehicles of the People's Republic of China

References

Unmanned aerial vehicles of China
Twin-boom aircraft